Raúl Armando Gorostegui (born 13 May 1984) is an Argentine professional footballer who plays for as a defender.

Career
Born in Buenos Aires, Gorostegui has played for Club Atlético Vélez Sarsfield, Instituto, Quilmes, Unión de Santa Fe, Juventud Antoniana, San Martín de San Juan, Sarmiento, Unión de Mar del Plata, Unión Guemes and Almirante Brown.

References

1984 births
Living people
Argentine footballers
Club Atlético Vélez Sarsfield footballers
Instituto footballers
Quilmes Atlético Club footballers
Unión de Santa Fe footballers
Juventud Antoniana footballers
San Martín de San Juan footballers
Club Atlético Sarmiento footballers
Unión de Mar del Plata footballers
Argentine Primera División players
Primera Nacional players
Torneo Argentino A players
Association football defenders
Club Almirante Brown footballers
Footballers from Buenos Aires
Pan American Games gold medalists for Argentina
Footballers at the 2003 Pan American Games
Pan American Games medalists in football
Medalists at the 2003 Pan American Games